Sadhankeri, also known as The lungs of Dharwad city, is a locality situated in the northwestern part of Dharwad.  It is one of the largest and greenest neighborhoods in Dharwad. It comprises residential and commercial structures with well-known landmarks, including the popular Sadhenkeri Park (Sadhankeri Lake Garden) which is very close to Police headquarters.

Landmarks

Sadhankeri is known for its Sadhankeri Lake park which is also a sunpoint.
Bendre Bhavan is the house of the popular poet & writer D.R Bendre who lived there for many years and also comes from Sadhankeri.
Police quarters is located in Sadhankeri. It's not a public place but a well known area comes under Sadhankeri.

Sadhankeri Garden

Sadhankeri Lake  (Lake is ‘’keri’’ in Kannada language), located near the police head quarters and is adjoint to the Sadhankeri park. The lake also has boating faculty which is a part of the park, there  is also a 1.5 km walkway on the periphery of the lake with shaded stone benches for visitors to sit, relax and enjoy the scenic serenity of the lake.

Health Care
There list of hospitals & health care centers are given below.
German Hospital
Our Lady of Lourdes hospital & school of nursing
Government primary health care hospital
Shravya hospital
Dr. Kalwad's health care clinic
Nadaf dental hospital.

Location 

To board a intercity bus one has to yet board another bus to Central Bus Station (CBT) Nehru Market and then continue to get to another locality.

See also
D. R. Bendre
Kelgeri
Saptapur
Saraswatpur
List of lakes of India

References

External links
Sadhankeri
Dharwad 

Cities and towns in Dharwad district
Neighborhoods in Dharwad